Karl Maria Alois Rawer (19 April 1913 – 17 April 2018) was a German specialist in radio wave propagation and the ionosphere. He developed the analytical code to determine suitable frequency ranges for short wave communication by which German forces built-up their long distance communications during World War II.

Biography
After studies of mathematics and physics in Freiburg and Munich (with Arnold Sommerfeld), under Jonathan Zenneck he wrote a thesis on partial reflection of radio waves in an ionospheric layer. Aware of this Johannes Plendl charged him to serve as adviser for the Shortwave communications of the German Luftwaffe, since 1943 for Navy and Army as well. 

Rawer's code assumes zig-zag paths between Earth and ionosphere. Monthly predictions take account of day-to-day variations. Long term changes from solar cycles is taken account of by Wolfgang Gleißberg´s prediction method.

After the war Yves Rocard, then director of French Navy research, was impressed by Rawer's code. He engaged him as "directeur scientifique" (1946–56) of his newly founded "Service de Prevision Ionospherique". 

Between 1956–69, Rawer, serving in Germany as director of "Ionosphären-Institut Breisach" switched to space research. With his team he participated in the first French scientific rocket launch 1954 in the Sahara desert and later they experimented aboard rockets of different nationality. 

From 1958 to 1964, he was "professeur associe" at the University of Paris. Rawer held several offices in the international space research organisation COSPAR. As director of "Fraunhofer-Institut für physikalische Weltraumforschung" (1969–79) he became the father of the two AEROS satellites, launched in 1972 and 1974. 

He was actively engaged in the International Geophysical Year (gold button 2007) and follow-ups. In the International Union of Radio Science (URSI) he served with William Roy Piggott as co-author of the booklet on ionogram reduction and was vice-chairman and chairman of the ionospheric committee 1966–72. He was the father and longtime chairman of the International Reference Ionosphere that since 1999 is International Standard.

Rawer was doctor honoris causa of the University of Düsseldorf, corresponding member of the International Academy of Astronautics and of "Oesterreichische Akademie der Wissenschaften Wien". He died on 17 April 2018 in March, Breisgau, two days before his 105th birthday.

References

Sources
 Karl Rawer: "Meine Kinder umkreisen die Erde" (autobiography). Herder, Freiburg i. Brsg., 159 S. 1986, 
 Bodo W. Reinisch: "Karl Rawer´s lfe and the history of the IRI". Adv. Space Res. 34, 1845R 2004
 Dieter Bilitza: "35 Years of International Reference Ionosphere - Karl Rawer´s legacy". Adv. Radio Sci. 2, 283, 2004

External links
 International Reference Ionosphere

1913 births
2018 deaths
German centenarians
Men centenarians
20th-century German physicists
Radio frequency propagation
Officers Crosses of the Order of Merit of the Federal Republic of Germany
Luftwaffe personnel of World War II
People from Neunkirchen, Saarland